Aldridgea is a monotypic genus of fungi belonging to the Agaricomycetes class; it does not belong to an order or a family. Originally documented in 1892 by English mycologist George Edward Massee, it contained the single species Aldridgea gelatinosa (now Coniophora gelatinosa). Presently, it consists of one species named Aldridgea ignatiana.

References 

Incertae sedis
Agaricomycetes genera
Monotypic fungi genera